The 2014 Dwars door Vlaanderen was the 69th edition of the Dwars door Vlaanderen cycle race and was held on 26 March 2014. The race started in Roeselare and finished in Waregem. The race was won by Niki Terpstra.

General classification

References

2014
2014 in road cycling
2014 in Belgian sport
March 2014 sports events in Europe